Greensleeves Rhythm Album #1: Bellyas is the first album in Greensleeves Records' rhythm album series.  It was released in February 2000 on CD and LP.  The album features various artists recorded over the "Bellyas" riddim, produced by reggae-dancehall artists and producers Ward 21.

Track listing
"Who Dem?" - Capleton
"Model & Pose" - Ward 21
"Two Minute More" - Mr. Vegas
"Skettel Tune" - Beenie Man & Angel Doolas
"Ghetto Youths" - Lexxus, Kiprich & Elephant Man
"Blood Stain" - Ward 21
"Praise" - Spragga Benz
"Halla Halla" - Lexxus
"Skin-A-Slap" - Red Rat
"Prowler" - Alozade
"Heights Of Great Men" - Beenie Man
"Live Up" - Bushman & I Lue
"Tight Pants" - Mega Banton
"Wash Pan" - Frisco Kid
"Mix Up Time" - Hawkeye
"Wi Like It" - Tanto Metro & Devonte
"Naah Go Switch" - Kiprich
"Dat Nuh Mek It" - Madd Anju
"Naah Heng Out" - Goofy
"Tight It Tight" - Jack A Diamond

References

2000 compilation albums
Reggae compilation albums
Greensleeves Records albums